Cynometra insularis is a species of plant in the family Fabaceae. It is found only in Fiji.

References

insularis
Endemic flora of Fiji
Least concern plants
Taxonomy articles created by Polbot